The 2005 DFL-Ligapokal was the ninth edition of the Ligapokal, now under control of the Deutsche Fußball Liga (DFL) as opposed to the German Football Association (DFB). The competition saw some format changes, with the preliminary round matches being played consecutively in the same stadium, and the final moved to the new Zentralstadion in Leipzig. Schalke 04 won their first title, beating VfB Stuttgart 1–0 in the final.

Participating clubs
A total of six teams qualified for the competition. The labels in the parentheses show how each team qualified for the place of its starting round:
1st, 2nd, 3rd, 4th, etc.: League position
CW: Cup winners
TH: Title holders

Matches

Preliminary round

Semi-finals

Final

References

DFL-Ligapokal seasons
Ligapokal